Annaphila astrologa is a moth in the family Noctuidae (the owlet moths) first described by William Barnes and James Halliday McDunnough in 1918. It is found in North America.

The MONA or Hodges number for Annaphila astrologa is 9857.

References

Further reading

 
 
 

Amphipyrinae
Articles created by Qbugbot
Moths described in 1918